The discography of American country and bluegrass singer Alison Krauss consists of thirteen studio albums—five solo, six with her group Union Station, and two collaboration albums (one with The Cox Family, the other with former Led Zeppelin frontman Robert Plant). She has also released four compilation albums, one live album (with Union Station), and over 30 singles. Her most successful album, Live, has been certified 2× Platinum.

In addition, she has appeared on numerous soundtracks, and helped renew interest in bluegrass music in the United States. Her soundtrack performances have led to further popularity, including the O Brother, Where Art Thou? soundtrack, which won the Grammy Award for Album of the Year in 2002 and is also credited with raising American interest in bluegrass, and the Cold Mountain soundtrack, which led to her performance at the 2004 Academy Awards. During her career she has won 28 Grammy Awards, making her the most awarded female artist (and the second most awarded artist overall) in Grammy history.

Her collaboration album with Plant, Raising Sand, debuted at number 2 on both the Top Country Albums chart and the Billboard 200, giving Krauss her highest entry on both charts. The album has been certified Platinum in the United States. It became a worldwide hit, charting within the Top 10 of several countries, including a number-one peak in Norway. It also won the Grammy Award for Album of the Year in 2009; in addition, its single "Please Read the Letter" won the Grammy Award for Record of the Year that same year.

Studio albums

As Alison Krauss & Union Station

Compilation albums

Live albums

Singles

As Alison Krauss & Union Station

As a featured artist

Other charted songs

Videography

Music videos

Notes

References

Country music discographies
Discographies of American artists
Folk music discographies